Augspurger Schoolhouse is a historic building in Woodsdale, Ohio. The original building was a rectangular schoolhouse. On November 1, 1984 it was listed in the National Register of Historic Places as part of a thematic resource, the "Augspurger Amish/Mennonite Settlement". As of 2016 the building had been demolished and the property left covered in detritus.

See also
 Historical preservation
 History of education in the United States
 National Register of Historic Places in Butler County, Ohio

References

External links
 
 

National Register of Historic Places in Butler County, Ohio
School buildings on the National Register of Historic Places in Ohio
Education in Ohio
Schoolhouses in the United States